House of Hackney is a luxury interiors label with a flagship store at St Michaels Clergy House, based in the East London shopping district of Central London. The brand specialises in British-made goods and reinvents traditional designs.

History

House of Hackney was founded in London in 2011 by husband-and-wife team Frieda Gormley and Javvy M Royle, a former buyer for Topshop and product designer respectively. The bright colours of the brand's prints are inspired by Victorian ornamentation and William Morris. Products include wallpaper, bed linen, dressing screens and lampshades, made in the United Kingdom where possible.

Having started off as an interiors brand, House of Hackney took its signature prints into the fashion realm with a clothing collection for Opening Ceremony, followed by capsule ranges for ASOS (retailer) in 2013 and & H&M Other Stories in 2018.

Along with a permanent space in Liberty and Bergdorf Goodman, House of Hackney opened its flagship store in Shoreditch in 2013. It was described by Time Out as "one of the most gorgeous retail establishments to land in London in years".

In October 2015, House of Hackney partnered with Eastpak on a collection of backpacks.

House of Hackney opened a new store space next to the Elizabeth Street Garden in New York in 2019.

In 2020, Gormley and Royle opened a bed and breakfast at Trematon Castle in Cornwall, in the estate’s Georgian house and Gate Lodge, and using their own designs and those of high-end heritage brands. In October they launched the first House of Hackney Axminster Carpets collection.

In January 2021, House of Hackney announced that they had been certified as a B Corporation for meeting the highest verified standards of social and environmental performance, transparency and accountability.

In March 2022, House of Hackney closed its Shoreditch High Street branch, and opened a new flagship store near to Old Street Station, at St Michael's Clergy House.

House of Hackney has received a Queen's Award.

See also
Shoreditch High Street

References

Shops in London
Furniture retailers of the United Kingdom
Clothing retailers of England
B Lab-certified corporations